Sarab-e Tiran (also Romanized as Sarāb-e Tīrān; also known as Sarāb-e Tīzān) is a village in Sanjabi Rural District, Kuzaran District, Kermanshah County, Kermanshah Province, Iran. At the 2006 census, its population was 173, in 37 families.

References 

Populated places in Kermanshah County